Pilkhuva may refer to 

 Pilkhuva, a village in Azamgarh, Mehnagar, Uttar Pradesh
 Pilkhuva (Ghaziabad), Uttar Pradesh
 Pilkhuwa, a town in Ghaziabad, Uttar Pradesh